Emma Kearney (born 1981) is a Northern Irish film, television and theatre actress. She is best known for her roles in British television series such as her recurring role as Rita Brannigan in soap opera Emmerdale and the sitcom The Gemma Factor.

Career

Television
Kearney has made guest appearances on many British television series.  Her first role was in Channel 4 soap opera Hollyoaks in 2003.  In 2006, Emma landed a recurring role as Rita Brannigan on Emmerdale as Paddy's love interest.  In 2010, she had a lead role in BBC Three sitcom The Gemma Factor.  Emma also appeared on the made-for-television films Omagh and The Baby War.

On 9 December 2010 she appeared as a midwife on the live episode of ITV1 soap opera Coronation Street, which was her second appearance on the show, and her first being back in 2004.  Emma's other acting credits include Where the Heart Is, Shameless, Spooks: Code 9, and Doctors.

Theatre
Kearney trained at Manchester Metropolitan Capitol School of Theatre and has appeared in several theatre productions throughout her acting career.

Between 2001 and 2003 she starred in productions at the Capitol Theatre in Manchester including Love's Labour's Lost, The Cherry Orchard, The Provok'd Wife, The Taming of the Shrew, and Dancing at Lughnasa.

In 2003, she appeared in Translations at the Library Theatre. She appeared in three plays in 2006, the first was Separate Tables at the Royal Exchange Theatre, and the others, The Mortal Ash, and Midden at the Oldham Coliseum Theatre.  In 2009, she appeared in the touring play Pack of Lies at the Devonshire Park Theatre.

Filmography

References

External links
 

1981 births
Living people
Film actresses from Northern Ireland
Stage actresses from Northern Ireland
Television actresses from Northern Ireland
People from Portglenone
English soap opera actresses
21st-century actresses from Northern Ireland
Date of birth missing (living people)
21st-century English women
21st-century English people